In enzymology, a 3-hydroxybutyryl-CoA dehydrogenase is an enzyme that catalyzes the chemical reaction

(S)-3-hydroxybutanoyl-CoA + NADP+  3-acetoacetyl-CoA + NADPH + H+

Thus, the two substrates of this enzyme are (S)-3-hydroxybutanoyl-CoA and NADP+; its 3 products are acetoacetyl-CoA, NADPH, and H+.

This enzyme belongs to the family of oxidoreductases, to be specific those acting on the CH-OH group of donor with NAD+ or NADP+ as acceptor. The systematic name of this enzyme class is (S)-3-hydroxybutanoyl-CoA:NADP+ oxidoreductase. Other names in common use include beta-hydroxybutyryl coenzyme A dehydrogenase, L-(+)-3-hydroxybutyryl-CoA dehydrogenase, BHBD, dehydrogenase, L-3-hydroxybutyryl coenzyme A (nicotinamide adenine, dinucleotide phosphate), L-(+)-3-hydroxybutyryl-CoA dehydrogenase, and beta-hydroxybutyryl-CoA dehydrogenase. This enzyme participates in benzoate degradation via coa ligation and butanoate metabolism.

References

 

EC 1.1.1
NADPH-dependent enzymes
Enzymes of known structure